Estádio Municipal Annibal Batista de Toledo is a multi-use stadium in Aparecida de Goiânia, Goiás, Brazil. It is used mostly for football matches, and has a maximum capacity of 6,645 people.

In July 2019, the city council of Aparecida de Goiânia announced that an expansion and renovation process was to be held on the stadium. The work finished nearly one year later.

References

Football venues in Goiás
Associação Atlética Aparecidense
Sports venues in Goiás